The canton of Mézel is a former administrative division in southeastern France. It was disbanded following the French canton reorganisation which came into effect in March 2015. It consisted of 8 communes, which joined the canton of Riez in 2015. It had 2,194 inhabitants (2012).

The canton comprised the following communes:

Beynes
Bras-d'Asse
Châteauredon
Estoublon 
Majastres
Mézel
Saint-Jeannet
Saint-Julien-d'Asse

Demographics

See also
Cantons of the Alpes-de-Haute-Provence department

References

Former cantons of Alpes-de-Haute-Provence
2015 disestablishments in France
States and territories disestablished in 2015